Vivour is surname common in West Africa. It is a contraction of the word Survivor.

Notable people with the surname 

 Akinwunmi Rhodes-Vivour, Nigerian jurist
 Bode Rhodes-Vivour, Nigerian jurist
 Gbadebo Rhodes-Vivour, Nigerian politician and architect 
 William Allen Vivour, 19th century planter from Equatorial Guinea

References